Felipe Segundo Guzmán (17 January 1879 – 16 June 1932) was a Bolivian politician who served as the 30th president of Bolivia on an interim basis from 1925 to 1926.

Guzmán was born in La Paz, Bolivia. A university professor and scholar, he championed the teaching of Spanish to native Bolivians, and called for a further incorporation into national life of the great mass of "Indians" which comprised the country's majority. He later served as Deputy and Senator in representation of the Republican Party of Bautista Saavedra.

When President Saavedra (1921–25) attempted to prolong his term in office alleging "grave irregularities" in the elections of 1925 (which he annulled), a massive outcry prompted him to leave office. He did so only with the understanding that Congress (controlled by his party) would proclaim as temporary president someone who would do his bidding. Congress, in turn, chose the head of the Senate, Guzmán, who was sworn in on September 3, 1925, and given the task of calling fresh elections within a year. This done, and with the triumph at the polls of the government endorsed candidate Hernando Siles, Guzmán left office in August 1926 and returned to relative obscurity.

Felipe Segundo Guzmán died in la Paz in June 1932, at the age of 53.

References

1879 births
1932 deaths
20th-century Bolivian lawyers
20th-century Bolivian politicians
Defense ministers of Bolivia
Education ministers of Bolivia
Government ministers of Bolivia
Members of the Chamber of Deputies (Bolivia)
Members of the Senate of Bolivia
Interior ministers of Bolivia
People from La Paz
Presidents of Bolivia
Presidents of the Senate of Bolivia
Socialist Republican Party (Bolivia) politicians